Jamnagar Municipal Corporation is responsible for the civic infrastructure and administration of the city of Jamnagar in Gujarat state of India. The organization is known, in short, as JMC. It was established in 1981. This civic administrative body administers an area of 26.4 km2. The Municipal commissioner of JMC is Satish Patel.

The governing structure of JMC consists of political and administrative wings. The political wing is an elected body of councilors headed by a mayor. The commissioner from the IAS cadre heads the administrative wing and is responsible for strategic and operational planning and management of the corporation.  The commissioner takes decisions on behalf of the board or the standing committee formed from the elected councilors to perform the duties of the corporation.

History
 Jamnagar City Council was established on 30 Dec 1875 by the then Maharaja of Nawanagar.
 The revenue collection for the city council was started on 1 July 1902 to make the Body Financially Self Dependent.
 The City Council was axed and the Municipality of Jamnagar was established by the then Bombay State on 2 October 1949 as per Bombay Provincial Municipal Corporation Act 1949.
 The present Jamnagar Municipal Corporation was established on 6 October 1981 after Jamnagar was part of the state of Gujarat and since then all the administrative activities of the J.M.C. is conducted as per Bombay Provincial Municipal Corporation Act 1949.
 The Jamnagar Municipal Corporation has an governing urban area of about 26.40 square kilometres and an urban population of 4,45,397 as per 2001 Census of India.

2021 Election

Services
The Jamnagar Municipal Corporation is responsible for administering and providing basic infrastructure facilities to the city. The following are the major services provided by the Municipality:
 Water Purification and Supply
 Sewage treatment and Disposal
 Garbage disposal and Street Cleanliness
 Solid Waste Management
 Disaster Management
 Building and Maintenance of Roads, Streets and Flyovers.
 Street Lighting
 Maintenance of Parks, Gardens and Open Plots (Spaces)
 Cemeteries and Crematoriums
 Registering of Births and Deaths
 Conservation of Heritage Sites
 Disease control, including Immunization
 Maintaining (Public) Municipal managed schools.

City Civic Center
Jamnagar Municipal Corporation has started City Civic Center in different areas of city to get maximum advantage of the technology and give transparency in the day-to-day administration. JMC has four City Civic Centers, operational in different areas of Jamnagar Municipal Corporation for the urban resident citizens of Jamnagar. City Civic Center provides the following facilities: 
 Collection and Assessment of Property Taxes
  Collection and Assessment of Water Charges
 Application for New Water Connection
 Complaint Redressal for the above, * Registration of Shop and Establishment 
 Registration of Birth and Death Certificates
 Approvals for Construction of Buildings under Municipality Area
 Other Permissions and various Tax Collection.

For the Administrative purposes the city is divided 16 wards with each ward having 4 corporators totalling to 64 corporators with half of it reserved for women for the entire municipality who then elect Mayor and his deputy.

The Corporation is headed by a Municipal Commissioner, an IAS officer appointed by the government of Gujarat. He wields the executive power of the house. The mayor heads the party with the largest number of corporators elected. The mayor is responsible for the day-to-day running of the city services.

Environment Safety Initiative
 JMC Commissioner banned the usage of Polythene bags, plastic pouches all under 25 microns in Jamnagar promoting Green India, Clean India initiative.

References

External links
 Official Website of Jamnagar Municipal Corporation

Jamnagar
Municipal corporations in Gujarat
1981 establishments in Gujarat